Garri Aiba (died 9 June 2004) was an opposition leader in  Republic of Abkhazia at the time of his murder. He died when his car came under fire on 9 June 2004.

History
Garri Aiba was a veteran of the 1992-1993 war with Georgia, in which he led Abkhazia anti-aircraft defenses, and a prominent businessman. From 1995 to 2000 he had been mayor of Sukhum, capital of Abkhazia.
Aiba had become one of the leaders of Amtsakhara, which was one of the main movements in opposition to the government of President Vladislav Ardzinba, two other leaders of which had also been killed in previous years.

Murder
On 9 June 2004, Aiba's car came under fire, fifty metres from his home in Sukhumi. He got out of the car in an attempt to protect his ten-year-old daughter, but was seriously injured, and died later that day in hospital. His death sent shockwaves through Abkhaz politics. Aiba had no business links and many people claimed that the killing was politically motivated. It sparked the resignations of several prominent ministers, including foreign minister (and fellow Amtsakhara leader) Sergey Shamba, interior minister Abessalom Beiya and Givi Agrba, head of the security services. However, Shamba later denied that his resignation was related to Aiba's death, and Prime Minister Raul Khadjimba refused to accept the resignations of Beiya and Agrba.

No one has yet been charged with Aiba's murder. Former opposition leader Sergei Bagapsh has since become president.

Notes

External links
 Abkhazia [Georgia] (2005)
Abkhazia Struggle Intensifies 

Year of birth missing
2004 deaths
Abkhaz–Georgian conflict
Assassinated activists
People murdered in Georgia (country)
Assassinated Abkhazian politicians
Mayors of Sukhumi
Members of the Sukhumi City Council
2004 murders in Georgia (country)